A neural spine sail is a large, flattish protrusion from the back of an animal formed of a sequence of extended vertebral spinous processes and associated tissues. Such structures are comparatively rare in modern animals, but have been identified in many extinct species of amphibians and amniotes. Paleontologists have proposed a number of ways in which the sail could have functioned in life.

Function
 
Varying suggestions have been made for the function of the sail.

Thermoregulation
The structure may have been used for thermoregulation. The base of the spines have a channel which may have contained a blood vessel supplying abundant blood to the sail.  The animal could have used the sail's large surface area to absorb heat from the sun in the morning.  As ectotherms they required heat from an external source before their muscles would start to function properly.  A predator would thus have an advantage over its slower moving prey.  The sail could be used in reverse if the animal was overheating.  By standing in the shade, the sail would radiate heat outwards.

However, recent studies have put in doubt the efficiency of this purported means of thermoregulation, and indeed no extinct sailed animal is currently assumed to have used its sails for thermoregulation.

Sexual selection
Elaborate body structures of many modern-day animals usually serve to attract members of the opposite sex during mating.  This has been proposed as one potential function of the sail.

Food storage
 
The structure may also have been more hump-like than sail-like, as noted by Stromer in 1915 ("one might rather think of the existence of a large hump of fat [German: Fettbuckel], to which the [neural spines] gave internal support") and by Jack Bowman Bailey in 1997. In support of his "buffalo-back" hypothesis, Bailey argued that in Spinosaurus, Ouranosaurus, and other dinosaurs with long neural spines, the spines were relatively shorter and thicker than the spines of pelycosaurs (which were known to have sails); instead, the dinosaurs' neural spines were similar to the neural spines of extinct hump-backed mammals such as Megacerops and Bison latifrons.

Camouflage
Dimetrodon may have used the sail on its back to help camouflage itself when hiding among reeds and waiting to ambush its prey.

Sound display
Gregory Paul argued that parallel neck sails of Amargasaurus would have reduced neck flexion. Instead, he proposed that, with their circular rather than flat cross-sections, these spines were more likely covered with a horny sheath. He also suggests that they could have been clattered together for a sound display. In 2022, a detailed study was published by Cerda et al. analyzing the structure, morphology, and microanatomy of the vertebral spines of Amargasaurus. They suggested that the spines were not covered in a keratinous sheath as previously believed. Osteohistology of the spines suggests that they were likely, if not exclusively, covered in a sail of skin. The spines are also highly vascularized and bear cyclical growth marks, adding credence to this theory.

List of organisms with a sail

Amphibians
Platyhystrix

Amniotes
Many Synapsids
Edaphosaurids
Sphenacodontids
Many Poposauroids
Ctenosauriscids
Lotosaurids
Certain dinosaurs
Acrocanthosaurus
Amargasaurus
Bajadasaurus
Deinocheirus
Ichthyovenator
Ouranosaurus
Pilmatueia
Rebbachisaurus
Spinosaurus
Suchomimus
Oxalaia

References

Amphibian anatomy
Reptile anatomy
Dinosaur anatomy